The 30th parallel south is a circle of latitude that is 30 degrees south of the Earth's equator. It stands one-third of the way between the equator and the South Pole and crosses Africa, the Indian Ocean, Australia, the Pacific Ocean, South America and the Atlantic Ocean.

At this latitude the sun is visible for 14 hours, 5 minutes during the summer solstice and 10 hours, 13 minutes during the winter solstice. On December 21, the sun is at 83.83 degrees up in the sky and at 36.17 degrees on June 21.

Around the world
Starting at the Prime Meridian and heading eastwards, the parallel 30° south passes through:

{| class="wikitable plainrowheaders"
! scope="col" width="125" | Co-ordinates
! scope="col" | Country, territory or ocean
! scope="col" | Notes
|-
| style="background:#b0e0e6;" | 
! scope="row" style="background:#b0e0e6;" | Atlantic Ocean
| style="background:#b0e0e6;" |
|-valign="top"
| 
! scope="row" | 
| Northern Cape Free State
|-
| 
! scope="row" | 
|
|-
| 
! scope="row" | 
| KwaZulu-Natal - passing just south of Durban
|-
| style="background:#b0e0e6;" | 
! scope="row" style="background:#b0e0e6;" | Indian Ocean
| style="background:#b0e0e6;" | 
|-valign="top"
| 
! scope="row" | 
| Western Australia South Australia New South Wales
|-valign="top"
| style="background:#b0e0e6;" | 
! scope="row" style="background:#b0e0e6;" | Pacific Ocean
| style="background:#b0e0e6;" | Passing between islands in the Kermadec chain, 
|-
| 
! scope="row" | 
| Coquimbo Region - passing just south of Coquimbo
|-valign="top"
| 
! scope="row" | 
| San Juan Province La Rioja Province Catamarca Province - Lago Salinas Grandes Córdoba Province Santiago del Estero Province Santa Fe Province Corrientes Province
|-
| 
! scope="row" | 
| Rio Grande do Sul - passing through Porto Alegre
|-
| style="background:#b0e0e6;" | 
! scope="row" style="background:#b0e0e6;" | Atlantic Ocean
| style="background:#b0e0e6;" |
|}

See also
29th parallel south
31st parallel south
30th parallel north

s30